Randall Berry is a Professor of Electrical and Computer Engineering at Northwestern University, Evanston, Illinois. He was named Fellow of the Institute of Electrical and Electronics Engineers (IEEE) in 2014 for contributions to resource allocation and interference management in wireless networks.

Berry obtained B.S. in electrical engineering from Missouri University of Science and Technology and later got his M.S. and Ph.D. in electrical engineering and computer science from Massachusetts Institute of Technology.

References

External links

20th-century births
Living people
American electrical engineers
Missouri University of Science and Technology alumni
MIT School of Engineering alumni
Northwestern University faculty
Fellow Members of the IEEE
21st-century American engineers
Year of birth missing (living people)
Place of birth missing (living people)